is a 1999 film  directed by Makoto Shinozaki. It is a documentary of the making of Takeshi Kitano's film Kikujiro. It was produced and distributed by Office Kitano and was screened at the Rotterdam Film Festival and other festivals.

External links

References

1990s Japanese-language films
Japanese documentary films
Films about filmmaking
1990s Japanese films